Naima Adedapo (born October 5, 1984) is an American singer and dancer from Milwaukee, Wisconsin. Adedapo placed in the top 11 on the tenth season of American Idol.

Early life
Adedapo was born in Maywood, Illinois, and her family moved to Milwaukee, Wisconsin, when she was ten. Adedapo is the daughter of Milwaukee area jazz singer Adekola Adedapo. Adedapo graduated high school from St. Joan Antida. Her senior year, Adedapo placed first at the Wisconsin Forensic Coaches Association's State Tournament in Demonstration Speaking for her speech on African dance, with drumming accompaniment by her brother. She later majored in Dance at the University of Wisconsin-Milwaukee.

American Idol

Overview
Adedapo auditioned for the tenth season of American Idol in Milwaukee, Wisconsin. She was not one of the five female vote-getters in the semi-final round to advance to the Top 13. She was one of the six selected to sing for a wild card. The judges chose three of the six, including Adedapo, to advance to the Top 13. On March 31, 2011, Adedapo and Thia Megia were eliminated from American Idol.

Performances/Results

 Adedapo was saved first from elimination.
 Due to the judges using their one save to save Casey Abrams, the Top 11 remained intact for another week.

Post-Idol
Adedapo and the rest of the top 11 performed in the 2011 American Idols LIVE! Tour, which began in West Valley City, Utah, on July 6, 2011, and ended in Manila, Philippines on September 20, 2011. Both the eliminated contestants, Naima and Thia Megia, appeared and performed on The Tonight Show with Jay Leno and Live with Regis and Kelly. Adedapo released a seven-song EP, Beautifully Made, which she co-wrote and co-produced, on November 20, 2015.

Personal life
Adedapo is married with two daughters and three stepdaughters. She was formerly a maintenance worker at Henry Maier Festival Park (home of Summerfest) in Milwaukee.

References

External links
Naima Adedapo on American Idol
Official homepage of Naima Adedapo

1984 births
21st-century African-American women singers
Living people
American Idol participants
Singers from Illinois
Singers from Wisconsin
People from Maywood, Illinois
American people of Yoruba descent
Yoruba women musicians
University of Wisconsin–Milwaukee alumni